Sigvaldi Kaldalóns (Stefánsson) (13 January 1881 – 28 July 1946) was an Icelandic composer and doctor. Unlike the avant-garde composers of his day, he wrote in a traditional romantic style and composed many of Iceland's most famous and widely performed songs, many of which are now wrongly assumed to be folk songs. His particular skill was in capturing the spirit of poems in his melodies, making him Iceland's foremost lyric composer. Since the end of 2016, his works has entered the public domain in Iceland.

Life
He was born in Garðastræti, Vaktarabær in the Grjóta neighbourhood of Reykjavik, the son of Stefán Egilsson, a mason, and Sesselju Sigvaldadóttir, a midwife. He attended Lærðu School, matriculating in 1902 and then gained a diploma in medicine in 1908 from the medical school in Reykjavik. He then travelled to Denmark, where he graduated in Copenhagen. On 16 September 1909 he married Karen Margrethe Thomsen (née Mengel), a Danish nurse.

Works
Kaldalóns wrote about 350 songs. Among his best-known compositions are:

 Ísland ögrum skorið (Iceland Deeply Carved) to a poem by Eggert Ólafsson (performance available on YouTube)
 Á Sprengisandi (Ride Hard Across the Sands) to a poem by Grímur Thomsen (performance available on YouTube)
 Suðurnesjamenn (performance available on YouTube)
 Svanasöngur á heiði (performance available on YouTube)
 Heimir  (performance available on YouTube)
 Erla, góða Erla
 Ave María
 Draumur hjarðsveinsins
 Þú eina hjartans yndið mitt og Ég lít í anda liðna tíð

References 

Sigvaldi Kaldolons
1881 births
1946 deaths